Rathasena Mata Temple is located on a hill on Maruwas area in the city of Udaipur, Rajasthan. This temple is located on a green hill in the Maruwas, area of Udaipur. It has uphill slope walkway to climb. It enshrines the stone idol of Rathasan Mata (also called Ratheshwari Mata or Rathsashayna Mata).

Location 
The temple is located at 24.731938°N 73.748812°E.

References 

Tourist attractions in Udaipur
Hindu temples in Udaipur